Lakeview Airport may refer to:

 Lakeview Airport (Michigan), also known as Griffith Field, an airport in Lakeview, Michigan, United States (FAA: 13C)
 Lakeview Airport (Texas) in Lake Dallas, Texas, United States (FAA: 30F)

Other airports in places named Lakeview:
 Gaston's Airport in Lakeview, Arkansas, United States (FAA: 3M0)
 Lake County Airport (Oregon) in Lakeview, Oregon, United States (FAA: LKV)